This is a list of people from Malmö, Sweden, filed by occupation and listed in alphabetical order by surname.

Academia 
 Gunilla Florby (born 1943), professor of English literature

Actors and filmmakers 
 Anita Ekberg (1931–2015), model and actress
 Lukas Moodysson (b. 1969), film director
 Eva Rydberg (b. 1943), singer, actress, comedian, revue-artist and dancer
 Jan Troell (b. 1931), film director
 Bo Widerberg (1930–1997), film director

Art and design 
 Monika Larsen Dennis (born 1963), sculptor, filmmaker, photographer
 Anna Friberger (born 1944), illustrator and set designer
 Sofia Helin (born 1972), actress, played Saga Norén on The Bridge

Medical 
 Caspar Bartholin (1585–1629), medical scholar
Elina Berglund (born 1984), physicist

Music 
 Björn Afzelius (1947–1999), musician
 Hasse Andersson (b. 1948), country singer and songwriter
The Cardigans since 1994, pop-rock-punk musical band
Nina Persson (born 1974), singer and lyricist, The Cardigans
Adrian Erlandsson (born 1970), musician
Håkan Hardenberger (b. 1961), trumpet player
Maja Ivarsson (born 1979), lead singer of The Sounds
Jonny Jakobsen (born 1963), musician
Arash Labaf (born 1977), singer
Magnus Martensson (b. 1966), musician and comedian
Amplitude Problem (born 1974), birth name Juan Irming; Swedish-American musician and producer
Promoe (born 1976), rapper and member of LoopTroop Rockers
May Qwinten (b. 1983), pop and rock singer
Mats Söderlund (b. 1969), singer, club manager, and model
Timbuktu (b. 1975), rapper and reggae artist
Lilly Walleni (1875–1920), opera singer
Svea Nordblad Welander (1898–1985), musician and composer
Jacques Werup (1945–2016), poet, author, jazz musician

Politicians 
 Per Engdahl (1909–1994), pro-Nazi politician
Per Albin Hansson (1885–1946), politician, Prime Minister of Sweden (1932–1946)
August Palm (1849–1922), politician, founder of the Swedish Social Democratic Party

Sports 
 Rasmus Andersson (born 1996), ice hockey player
 André Burakovsky (born 1995), NHL hockey player
 Gustav Freij (1922–1973), wrestler, Olympic gold medalist
 Zlatan Ibrahimović (born 1981), football player
Ilir Latifi (born 1983), mixed martial arts fighter
Pontus Jansson  (born 1991), football player
Kim Johnsson (born 1976), ice hockey player
Fredrik Jonsson (born 1977), tennis player
Yksel Osmanovski (b. 1977), football player
Mikael Pernfors (b. 1963), tennis player
Christian Wilhelmsson (b. 1979), football player
Anthony Elanga (born 2002), football player

Writers 
 Börje Dorch (1929–2004), draughtsman and writer
 Hjalmar Gullberg (1898–1961), poet, member of the Swedish Academy
 Björn Ranelid (b. 1949), author

Others 
Beata Losman (b. 1938), Swedish archivist
Felix von Luckner (1881–1966), sailor
Henrik Reuterdahl (1795–1870), Archbishop of Uppsala (1856–1870)
Frans Suell (1744–1818), businessman who built the Malmö harbour

Malmo
List